The 1995–96 NBA season was the Grizzlies' first season in the National Basketball Association. The Vancouver Grizzlies, along with the Toronto Raptors became expansion NBA franchises in 1995. They were the first NBA teams to play in Canada since the 1946–47 Toronto Huskies. The Grizzlies revealed a new primary logo of a grizzly bear holding a basketball, and got new uniforms with Native American markings on the trims of their jerseys, adding turquoise and brown to their color scheme. 

In the 1995 NBA expansion draft, the team selected veteran players like Greg Anthony, Blue Edwards, Byron Scott, Benoit Benjamin, Gerald Wilkins and Kenny Gattison. The team also signed free agents Chris King and undrafted rookie forward Ashraf Amaya, and acquired Anthony Avent from the Orlando Magic. The Grizzlies received the sixth overall pick in the 1995 NBA draft, and selected center Bryant Reeves out of Oklahoma State. The team also hired Brian Winters as their first head coach. 

In their NBA debut on November 3, 1995, the Grizzlies got off to a solid start defeating the Portland Trail Blazers on the road, 92–80. Two nights later on November 5, the Grizzlies had a successful home debut at General Motors Place by beating the Minnesota Timberwolves in overtime, 100–98. Despite the start, they struggled and posted a dreadful 19-game losing streak afterwards. After 13 games, Benjamin was traded to the Milwaukee Bucks in exchange for Eric Murdock and second-year forward Eric Mobley, while at midseason, Gattison was dealt to the Orlando Magic in exchange for Jeff Turner, who never played for the Grizzlies due to a knee injury. After holding a 10–37 record at the All-Star break, the Grizzlies then suffered a dreadful 23-game losing streak during the second half of the season, including a winless month in March, and finished their inaugural season last place in the Midwest Division with an NBA worst record of 15 wins and 67 losses.

Only four Grizzlies averaged 10 or more points per game, as Anthony averaged 14.0 points, 6.9 assists and 1.7 steals per game, while Reeves averaged 13.3 points and 7.4 rebounds per game, and was selected to the NBA All-Rookie Second Team. In addition, Edwards provided the team with 12.7 points and 1.4 steals per game, while Scott played a sixth man role, averaging 10.2 points per game off the bench, Murdock contributed 9.1 points and 2.0 steals per game also off the bench, and King provided with 7.9 points and 3.6 rebounds per game. Wilkins averaged 6.7 points per game, but only played just 28 games due to back and Achilles tendon injuries, while second round draft pick Lawrence Moten contributed 6.6 points per game, Amaya averaged 6.3 points and 5.6 rebounds per game, and Avent provided with 5.8 points and 5.6 rebounds per game. 

Following the season, Scott re-signed as a free agent with his former team, the Los Angeles Lakers, while Wilkins signed with the Orlando Magic, Murdock signed with the Denver Nuggets, Amaya signed with the Washington Bullets, and King, Avent and Turner were all released to free agency. The Grizzlies' new logo would remain in use until 2001, where the team moved to Memphis, Tennessee and replaced the word "Vancouver" with "Memphis" on the logo. The original logo lasted until 2004, while the new uniforms lasted until 2000.

Offseason

NBA Expansion Draft
The Grizzlies roster was filled during the 1995 NBA Expansion Draft.  By way of winning a coin flip with the Toronto Raptors, Vancouver elected to choose the former, between a higher NBA Draft pick and the first pick in the NBA Expansion Draft, and therefore had the second pick in this draft.  With their first pick, the Grizzlies selected point guard Greg Anthony from the New York Knicks.

NBA draft

The Grizzlies first ever draft pick was Bryant Reeves.

Roster

Roster Notes
Power forward Jeff Turner was acquired from the Orlando Magic at midseason, but did not play for the Grizzlies due to a knee injury.

First game
 On November 3, 1995, Vancouver played their first ever game in Portland against the Trail Blazers and beat the Blazers by a score of 92–80.  Benoit Benjamin scored a team high 29 points and 13 rebounds for the Grizzlies.

Regular season
Although they won their first two games in franchise history, the Grizzlies finished with the worst win–loss record in the 1995–96 NBA season, as is typical for an expansion team, and lost 23 straight games from February to April (setting an NBA single-season record now held by the Philadelphia 76ers with 27.)

Highs
 On November 3, 1995, Vancouver plays their first ever game, defeating the Portland Trail Blazers by a score of 92–80 in Portland.  On November 5, 1995, the Grizzlies make their home debut, defeating the Minnesota Timberwolves 100–98 in overtime in front of 19,113 fans, to begin the season with a 2–0 record.
 The Grizzlies defeat nearby rivals the Seattle SuperSonics by a single point in a hotly contested game on December 19, 1995. The crowd leaves ecstatic.
 The Grizzlies hold the Miami Heat to only 65 points in a 69–65 victory on January 13, 1996.
 Vancouver finishes the season on a positive note, defeating the Denver Nuggets and Los Angeles Clippers on the road.

Lows
 After starting the season 2–0, Vancouver would lose their next 19 games to quickly fall into last place in the Midwest Division.
 Vancouver was held to a season low 62 points in a 111–62 loss to the San Antonio Spurs on November 8, 1995.
 On December 10, 1995, the Grizzlies play the Toronto Raptors for the first time. The first NBA regular season game contested between two non-U.S. based teams. The game is held at General Motors Place in Vancouver. The Raptors win the game by a score of 93–81.
 On April 2, 1996, Vancouver loses its 23rd straight game, losing 101–85 to the Portland Trail Blazers.  The loss was also the Grizzlies 29th in their last 30 games.

Season standings

Record vs. opponents

Game log

Player statistics

Franchise firsts
On opening night, the Grizzlies would spoil the Portland Trail Blazers debut at the Rose Garden Arena by defeating them. A few nights later, the Grizzlies would play their first home game, defeating the Minnesota Timberwolves at the buzzer.

Awards and records
 Bryant Reeves, Second Team, NBA All-Rookie Team

Transactions

References

 Grizzlies on Database Basketball
 Grizzlies on Basketball Reference
 Expansion Draft Details

Van
Vancouver Grizzlies seasons